Czech culture has been shaped by its geographical position in the middle of Europe, influences from its neighbours, political and social changes, wars and times of peace. Prague's significance as a European cultural center rose and fell throughout history, but Czech culture remains distinct to this day.

There are 16 Czech locations listed among the World Heritage Sites by UNESCO, six Czechs have been awarded a Nobel Prize and 173 have been nominated.

History

Architecture

The Czech Republic has been home to many architectural jewels and renowned architects. Peter Parler's contributions to gothic Prague, Benedikt Rejt's late gothic deconstructivistic work, father and son Dietzenhofers' baroque works, Santini's unique baroque style, Fanta's and Polívka's Art Nouveau landmarks of the early 20th century Prague, Rondocubist attempts of Gočár and Janák at creating a distinct national style for the new Czechoslovak Republic – all of these are great examples of the rich architectural tradition of the Czech lands. The Czechoslovak pavilion was awarded the best pavilion of the 1958 World Expo in Brussels, earning the name Brussels style for the Czech architectural styles of those years. Jan Kaplický was a renowned Czech postmodern architect, particularly known for his works in the United Kingdom and one of the best known contemporary Czech architects is Eva Jiřičná, who won the Jane Drew Prize in 2013.

Art

The art tradition in the Czech lands starts with engravings on mammoth tusks found in Pavlov and Předmostí at Přerov, and various Venus figurines, the most famous being the Venus of Dolní Věstonice. Artists from medieval times are mostly anonymous. The three most notable might be Master of the Litoměřice Altarpiece, Master of the Třeboň Altarpiece and Master of Vyšší Brod. Another notable Czech gothic artist is Master Theodoric, a court painter of the Holy Roman Emperor Charles IV and his work in Karlštejn. Karel Škréta's portraits, Wenceslaus Hollar's engravings and etchings or Ferdinand Brokoff's statues on Charles Bridge belong among the best examples of Czech baroque art. 

One of the most prominent Czech romanticist painters was Josef Mánes, whose pupil was the versatile draftsman, illustrator and facade decorator Mikoláš Aleš. One of the leading figures of Art Nouveau was Alphonse Mucha, best known for his theatrical posters and decorative panels. Bohumil Kubišta created some of the most influential works of Czech expressionism and cubism. Josef Lada was one of the most notable Czech illustrators of the 20th century together with Zdeněk Burian, famous for his work in Paleoart. One of the founding figures of modern Czech abstract art was František Kupka, whose painting Divertimento II sold in 2020 set the new Czech auction record. Zdeněk Miler was one of the most recognized Czech animators and cartoonists, known for his character of The Little Mole (Krteček in Czech). Possibly the best known contemporary Czech artist is David Černý known for his installations in public spaces.

Cinema

The history of Czech cinema starts with Jan Kříženecký, an early pioneer of cinematography from the end of the 19th century. The first major film studio, Barrandov Studios, was launched by Miloš Havel in 1933. Otakar Vávra was among the most notable domestic directors in Czechoslovakia from the late 1930s onward. In the 1960s – leading up to the Prague Spring of 1968 – the Czechoslovak New Wave emerged, led by directors like Miloš Forman, Věra Chytilová or Jiří Menzel. Miloš Forman managed to flee before the invasion of Czechoslovakia in 1968 and continued his career in the United States, where he reached high critical acclaim and received two Academy Awards for Best Director for his movies  One Flew Over the Cuckoo's Nest (1975) and Amadeus (1984). Jiří Menzel was another Academy Award laureate, winning the 1967 Academy Award for Best Foreign Language Film with his first feature film, Closely Watched Trains. A contemporary director Jan Svěrák is another laureate of the Academy Award for Best Foreign Language Film, which he received for his drama Kolya in 1996. 

The Czech Republic also has a long tradition in animated movies. Probably the most notable animator is Jiří Trnka – active from 1940s to 1960s – recognized especially for his stop motion puppet movies.

Cuisine and diet

Traditionally, the main meal of the day consists of two courses with the first being a soup. Traditional main courses in Czech cuisine are mostly meat-based, often accompanied by a sauce or a gravy with a side dish of dumplings or potatoes. Mushroom and berry picking remain a popular hobby among many Czechs during the summer and early autumn. Czech cuisine is also affected by the popularity of making compotes. Czechs are known to have the highest consumption of beer per person of any nation in the world. In 2020, the average Czech drank 143.3 liters of beer in a year. 

Among the most common traditional dishes are roasted pork with dumplings and cabbage (vepřo, knedlo, zelo in Czech), svíčková na smetaně, Czech guláš, or schnitzel (řízek in Czech) with potato salad.

Folklore and traditions

The most widely celebrated holiday is Christmas, beginning with a dinner on December 24. The traditional Christmas dinner consists of a fried Czech carp and a potato salad, but many people replace it with a chicken or pork schnitzel.

Easter, or "Velikonoce" (meaning "great nights"), is another major holiday in the Czech Republic. Red is a very commonly worn color during this time, because it symbolizes joy, health, happiness, and new life that comes with spring. Families elaborately decorate Easter eggs together. Another Easter tradition is the whipping of others' legs with the pomlázka, which is a willow switch. Willow twigs are braided together and then are used by young boys to whip the girls' bottoms usually four times. This long-standing tradition is thought to bring health and youth to girls and women. The switch is called pomlázka meaning "rejuvenator", implying that a female struck by a pomlázka will become younger and prettier.

January first is New Year's Day.  After a late morning start the main meal of the day is prepared, which should include pork for good luck and lentils for prosperity in the new year. It's bad luck to eat fish, your luck could swim away, or poultry, your luck could fly away. January 6 is the Feast of the Three Kings.  In many Czech and Slovak villages, boys dress up as the three wise men “Kaspar, Balthazar and Melchior”. With a piece of chalk the boys write  K + B + M (or K + M + B) above the doorways on houses, where people donate money for charity. This brings blessings on that home and its family for a year. The chalk letters should never be cleaned off, but only replaced the next year. This is also usually the day the Christmas tree is taken down.

Literature

Music

One of the most notable early baroque composers is Adam Václav Michna of Otradovice, who lived in Jindřichův Hradec in the 17th century. He is the author of the oldest known Czech Christmas carol Chtíc, aby spal. The biggest name among the Czech 18th century composers is probably Jan Dismas Zelenka, who was the director of the renowned Dresden Hofkapelle. He was also a great inspiration for Bedřich Smetana, who is generally considered one of the most influential Czech composers of 19th century classical music together with Antonín Dvořák and Leoš Janáček. Of these three, the one best known internationally is Antonín Dvořák, being well received in the Great Britain and spending three years in the US as the director of the National Conservatory of Music in New York City. Dvořák's New World Symphony became "one of the most popular of all time" according to Clapham. 19th century Bohemia is also a cradle of the popular folk dance Polka. Among the Czech musicians of the 20th century, Karel Gott stands out the most, being the 42 times winner of the Golden Nightingale for the best male singer. He was one of the few musicians who were allowed to perform in the Western Bloc during the Cold War, becoming known as the "Golden voice of Prague".

Public holidays

Sports

Theatre

Czech theatrical tradition played a big part in the Czech National Revival. Opening of the National Theatre in Prague in 1881 was a great success of the Czech nationalists. In 1920, Karel Čapek published his science fiction play R.U.R., where he introduced the word "robot" to the English language and to science fiction as a whole. A famous avant-garde theatre formed in the 1920s was the Osvobozené divadlo (Liberated theatre in English) of Jan Werich and Jiří Voskovec. Václav Havel – one of the leaders of the democratic dissent during the rule of the Communist Party and the first Czech president – was also a playwright, best known for his 1963 absurd play The Garden Party, which criticized conformism in socialist Czechoslovakia.

Museum

See also
 Name days in the Czech Republic
 Flag of the Czech Republic
 National anthem of the Czech Republic
 Prague underground (culture)
 Youth in the Czech Republic

References

External links
 Czech culture- Culture of the Czech Republic
 Current Czech events abroad
Cultural life of the Czech Republic

 

pt:República Checa#Cultura